Ashley Bell is an American actress. She is known for her role as Nell Sweetzer in the films The Last Exorcism and The Last Exorcism Part II.

Personal life
Ashley Bell was born in Santa Monica, California, the daughter of Victoria Carroll, an actress, and Michael Bell, an actor.

Ashley attended the Tisch School of the Arts at New York University and graduated in 2007 with a Bachelor of Fine Arts Degree.

Career
Following a string of film and television appearances on Boston Public, CSI: Crime Scene Investigation, the Mark Polish-penned Stay Cool and a four episode arc on Showtime's The United States of Tara.

Bell made her feature film principal debut, starring as Nell Sweetzer, in the 2010 horror film The Last Exorcism. Her performance garnered her a 2011 Independent Spirit Award nomination for Best Supporting Actress.

Filmography

References

External links 

Year of birth missing (living people)
Living people
Actresses from Santa Monica, California
American film actresses
American voice actresses
American video game actresses
21st-century American actresses
Tisch School of the Arts alumni